The Municipal Ground is a cricket ground in Alton, Hampshire.  The ground was constructed as a result of the efforts of G.J. Poole, the headmaster of a local Grammar School.  Constructed by 1899, the Hampshire Second XI played there in 1899 in the grounds first recorded match, while Hampshire later played one first-class match at the ground, against the touring South Africans in 1904.  The match ended in a South African victory by an innings and 19 runs, during which South African batsman Louis Tancred was dismissed for 99 by Hesketh Hesketh-Prichard, while in Hampshire's first-innings Johannes Kotze took a five wicket haul with figures of 5/66.

See also
List of Hampshire County Cricket Club grounds
List of cricket grounds in England and Wales

References

External links
Municipal Ground at ESPNcricinfo
Municipal Ground at CricketArchive

Hampshire County Cricket Club
Cricket grounds in Hampshire
Alton, Hampshire
Sports venues completed in 1899
1899 establishments in England